Sudong County is a county in South Hamgyŏng province, North Korea.  It was formed from part of Kowŏn County in December 1990.

Sudong is the site of a major coal seam first discovered in 1918.  The P'yŏngra Line of the Korean State Railway passes through the district.

Administrative divisions
Sudong is divided into 6 tong (neighbourhoods) and 14 ri (villages):

Transportation 
Sudong-gu has a trolleybus line opened in 1979 running within this district, linking residential areas to Kowon mine. The line opened in 1979, with a number of second hand Chollima 9.11 trolleybuses used to serve the line initially. The line appears to no longer have any trolleybuses.

Kowon Tangwang Line runs to this district from Tunjon station, serving the colliery.

See also
Geography of North Korea
Administrative divisions of North Korea
South Hamgyong

Notes

Counties of South Hamgyong